Salar de Quisquiro, also known as Salar de Loyoques, is a salt pan in northern Chile and covers an area of around .

The salt pan is located within La Pacana caldera, south of Salar de Tara.

References

Quisquiro
Landforms of Antofagasta Region